Carson James Wentz (born December 30, 1992) is an American football quarterback. He played college football at North Dakota State, where he won two consecutive NCAA FCS national championships as the team's starter. Wentz was selected second overall by the Philadelphia Eagles in the 2016 NFL Draft, making him the FCS's highest drafted player.

Wentz's greatest success with the Eagles was in 2017 when he led them to an 11–2 record. Although he suffered a season-ending injury, Wentz helped put the Eagles in position to obtain the top seed of the National Football Conference (NFC), which culminated with the franchise's first Super Bowl title in Super Bowl LII. He also earned Pro Bowl and second-team All-Pro honors. 

Wentz helped bring Philadelphia back to the playoffs during his next two seasons, but further injuries limited his participation and he concurrently saw a decline in play. He was benched for Jalen Hurts in 2020 and was traded to the Indianapolis Colts in 2021 and the Washington Commanders in 2022, who released him following the season.

Early years
Born in Raleigh, North Carolina, Wentz moved to North Dakota with his family at the age of three. He played quarterback and defensive back for the football team at Century High School in Bismarck, and also played basketball and baseball at the school.

College career
Wentz attended North Dakota State, redshirting his first season with the Bison as they won their first FCS title under ninth-year head coach Craig Bohl.

As a redshirt freshman in 2012, Wentz was the backup quarterback to Brock Jensen and played in his first collegiate game on September 22. He completed all eight of his passes for 93 yards and threw his first touchdown in relief of Jensen in a 66–7 blowout victory over the Prairie View A&M Panthers. Wentz finished the season completing 12-of-16 pass attempts for 144 passing yards and two touchdowns.

Wentz was again the second-string quarterback in 2013 and appeared in 11 games. He had his best game that season on October 13, against Delaware State, completing 10-of-13 attempted passes for 105 passing yards and a touchdown. Wentz ended his redshirt sophomore season completing 22-of-30 passes for 209 yards and a touchdown.

Wentz became the Bison starting quarterback during his junior year in 2014. In his first start in the opener at Iowa State of the Big 12 Conference, he completed 18-of-28 pass attempts for 204 yards in a 34–14 victory on August 30. During the game at Western Illinois on October 10, Wentz caught a 16-yard touchdown pass from running back John Crockett and helped lead the Bison to a 17–10 comeback victory. Statistically, his best game that season was at Missouri State, where he threw for 247 yards and five touchdowns.

Wentz led NDSU to a 15–1 record. On January 10, 2015, he started in his first national championship game against Illinois State and passed for 287 yards and a touchdown and rushed for 87 yards and scored a touchdown on a five-yard run to give North Dakota State the lead with 37 seconds left. NDSU won their fourth consecutive NCAA Division I Football Championship game, 29–27. Wentz started all 16 games in 2014, completing 228 of 358 passes for 3,111 yards with 25 touchdowns and 10 interceptions. He was also the team's second leading rusher, with 642 rushing yards and six rushing touchdowns.

As a fifth-year senior in 2015, Wentz had one of the best games of his career on October 10 against Northern Iowa, when he passed for a career-high 335 yards. The following week against South Dakota, Wentz suffered a broken wrist in the first half but managed to complete the game with 16-of-28 completions, 195 passing yards, and two touchdown passes as the Bison lost 24–21. After starting the first six games of the season and completing 63.7 percent of his passes for a total of 1,454 yards and 16 touchdowns, he missed the next eight weeks of the season. He returned to practice in the beginning of December and was cleared to play in the national championship. On January 9, 2016, Wentz led the Bison to its fifth straight FCS title, running for two touchdowns and throwing for a third. He was named the NCAA Division I-AA Championship Game Most Outstanding Player for the second straight year.

Wentz graduated with a degree in health and physical education, finishing with a 4.0 GPA and twice earning recognition as an Academic All-American by the College Sports Information Directors of America, first for Division I football and later for all Division I sports.

Statistics

Professional career

In February 2016, most analysts had Wentz projected to be selected in the mid-first round of the draft. However, Wentz began to be regarded as a Top 10 prospect after his pro day. On January 30, 2016, he played in the 2016 Reese's Senior Bowl and finished the game completing 6 of 10 pass attempts for 50 yards. At the NFL Scouting Combine, Wentz showcased his athleticism as he was in the top three in the 40-yard dash, the broad jump, and the three-cone drill among all quarterbacks. Wentz also reportedly scored a 40/50 on his Wonderlic test.

Philadelphia Eagles

2016 season

On April 28, 2016, the Philadelphia Eagles selected Wentz in the first round with the second overall pick in the 2016 NFL Draft. He was the first quarterback the Eagles selected in the first round of an NFL Draft since Donovan McNabb in 1999, who was also taken second overall. He was also the highest-selected FCS quarterback taken in draft history and the first FCS quarterback taken in the first round since Joe Flacco in 2008. The Eagles traded three top 100 picks in 2016, a first round pick in 2017, and a second round pick in 2018 in order to move up in the draft order and get him. Wentz signed a four-year, fully guaranteed contract worth $26.67 million on May 12, 2016.

He suffered a rib injury in the team's first preseason game of 2016, but was fully healthy for the beginning of the 2016 regular season. Originally intending to have Wentz sit and learn for the 2016 season, those plans changed when the Eagles traded quarterback Sam Bradford to the Minnesota Vikings in September. The same day, it was also reported that the team planned to start Wentz for the 2016 season when he became healthy. On September 5, Wentz was named the starter for the Eagles' 2016 season opener against the Cleveland Browns. In the game he threw for 278 passing yards and two touchdowns in the 29–10 victory. He was named the Pepsi NFL Rookie of the Week for Week 1. Wentz threw for 190 yards and a touchdown in a 29–14 win over the Chicago Bears in Week 2. He became the first rookie quarterback since 1970 to win his first two games of the season and not throw an interception. In Week 3 against the Pittsburgh Steelers, Wentz finished with 301 passing yards and two touchdowns as the Eagles won 34–3. He was named the NFC Offensive Player of the Week for his performance against the Steelers. In Week 9, against the New York Giants, he was 27-of-47 for a season-high 364 yards and two interceptions in the 28–23 loss. In his rookie season, Wentz started all 16 games for the Eagles as they finished the season with a 7–9 record. Wentz threw for a league-record 379 completions by a rookie, breaking the record of 354 held by former teammate Sam Bradford, who was with the St. Louis Rams at the time. His 379 completions also set a single season franchise record, breaking the record of 346 also held by Bradford from the previous season. Wentz also set a single season franchise record with 607 pass attempts, the second highest attempts by a rookie in league history only trailing Andrew Luck, who had 627 in the 2012 season.

2017 season

In Week 1 against the Washington Redskins, Wentz finished with 307 passing yards, two touchdowns, and an interception from a pass tipped at the line of scrimmage as the Eagles won by a score of 30–17. In Week 2 against the Kansas City Chiefs, Wentz threw for 333 yards, two touchdowns, and one interception. In addition, he rushed for 55 yards in the 27–20 loss. In a Week 5 34–7 rout over the Arizona Cardinals, Wentz finished the game with 304 yards and a career-high four passing touchdowns. In the first five games of 2017, he passed for 1,362 yards and ten touchdowns with three interceptions. After this start, NFL insiders and reports ranked Wentz as a possible NFL MVP. Wentz was named the NFC Offensive Player of the Week for Week 7 after passing for 268 yards and a career-high tying four touchdowns in a 34–24 win over the Redskins. During Week 9 against the Denver Broncos, Wentz finished with 199 passing yards and four touchdowns as the Eagles won 51–23. 

During Week 14 against the Los Angeles Rams, Wentz left the game due to an apparent knee injury. He finished with 291 passing yards, four touchdowns, and an interception as the Eagles won 43–35. The win earned Wentz's first NFC East Title in the Pederson/Wentz era. The next day, an MRI revealed that he suffered a torn ACL, keeping him out for the remainder of the season. In 13 starts, Wentz finished the year with 3,296 passing yards, 33 touchdowns, seven interceptions, a 60.2 completion percentage, and a 101.9 quarterback rating. On December 13, Wentz underwent successful surgery on his ACL. Wentz was selected to his first Pro Bowl on December 19, but could not participate due to the aftermath of his recent knee surgery. He was ranked third by his fellow players on the NFL Top 100 Players of 2018. Led by Nick Foles, the Eagles defeated the New England Patriots 41–33 in Super Bowl LII, the first Super Bowl win in franchise history.

In 2022, an article in The Philadelphia Inquirer reported that prior to Super Bowl LII, Wentz expressed displeasure to other injured teammates that the Eagles were seeing success without him. Wentz was immediately confronted by one of the players and the two had to be physically separated. Later in November 2022, former teammate Darren Sproles, who was on the Super Bowl winning team, revealed that he had a conversation with Wentz saying "I had to make him realize that you [have to] be happy for the team. We’re all mad that we’re not playing; we’re all hurt, but you still [have to] be happy for the team.

2018 season

On June 25, 2018, prior to the start of the new season, Wentz was ranked third overall in the NFL Top 100 Players of 2018. It is the highest Top 100 debut ranking in the history of the league.

Wentz missed the first two games in an effort to continue recovery from his ACL injury and Nick Foles remained as the starter. On September 17, Wentz was medically cleared and retained his starting quarterback role. In his 2018 debut, Wentz would finish with 255 yards, one touchdown, and an interception in the Eagles' 20–16 win against the Indianapolis Colts in Week 3. The Eagles experienced mixed results with Wentz as starter. 

In November 2018, with the Eagles sitting at 5-6 on the season, an anonymous Eagles player revealed to Josina Anderson that he believed Wentz was negatively impacting the team. The source stated that Wentz was over-targeting tight end Zach Ertz, which was detrimental to the offensive's rhythm.

Near the end of the season, Wentz dealt with a back injury and the Eagles not wanting to risk further injury decided to shut him down for the season and put in Nick Foles as the starter for the rest of the season. He finished with a 5–6 record and passed for 3,074 yards, 21 touchdowns, and seven interceptions. Foles, playing in Wentz's absence went 3-0 and lead the Eagles to a playoff win. Wentz was ranked 96th by his fellow players on the NFL Top 100 Players of 2019.

Following the conclusion of the 2018 season, Joseph Santoliquito writing in PhillyVoice ran a piece where more than 12 Eagles players were anonymously interviewed. The story revealed how players found Wentz to be "selfish" and "egotistical." The players stated that Wentz often called unecessary audibles on plays, which ultimately lead to sacks or turnovers. Wentz was also described as being a bully towards Eagles offensive coordinator Mike Groh and not open to coaching.

2019 season

On April 29, 2019, the Eagles exercised the fifth-year option on Wentz's contract. On June 6, 2019, the Eagles signed Wentz to a four-year, $128 million contract extension with $107 million guaranteed, keeping him under contract through the 2024 season. 

In Week 1 against the Washington Redskins, Wentz threw for 313 yards and three touchdowns as the Eagles won 32–27. In Week 4, against the Green Bay Packers, he helped lead the Eagles to a 34–27 victory with three passing touchdowns. 

Following a slow start at 3-3, another report came out, containing information from an anonymous Eagles player, who was critical of Wentz. The source said that Wentz was trying to do too much and was often looking for a big play rather than taking the short check down. At the time of the report, Wentz only had a completion percentage of 38% on passes that traveled 15 yards in the air and had three interceptions on passes of that variety, which was tied for most in the league.

In Week 13 against the Miami Dolphins, Wentz threw for 310 yards, three touchdowns, and one interception in the 37–31 loss. In Week 14, against the New York Giants, Wentz helped lead a comeback victory with 325 passing yards and two touchdowns in the 23–17 overtime win. In Week 15 against the Redskins, Wentz threw for 266 yards and three touchdowns during another comeback victory as the Eagles won 37–27. In Week 16 against the Dallas Cowboys, Wentz threw for 319 yards and a touchdown during the 17–9 win. Wentz helped lead the Eagles to a crucial 34–17 victory over the New York Giants in Week 17. Wentz had 289 yards and a touchdown in the victory, which gave the Eagles the NFC East title. The division title was his second in the Pederson/Wentz era. Wentz finished the 2019 season with 4,039 passing yards, 27 touchdowns, and seven interceptions. He became the first quarterback in franchise history to pass for at least 4,000 yards and the first in the NFL to do so without any receiver catching at least 500 yards.

In the NFC Wild Card Round against the Seattle Seahawks, Wentz left the game with a head injury in the first quarter after defensive end Jadeveon Clowney made a helmet to helmet hit on him.  He was ruled out of the game with a concussion after playing just nine snaps in his post-season debut.  The Eagles lost the game 17–9.

2020 season

Wentz made his return from injury in Week 1 against the Washington Football Team.  During the game, Wentz threw for 270 yards, two touchdowns, and two interceptions as the Eagles lost 27–17.  In the second quarter, the Eagles had a 17–0 lead over the Football Team, but they never managed to score for the rest of the game. In Week 2 against the Los Angeles Rams, Wentz continued to struggle, throwing for 242 yards and two interceptions during the 37–19 loss. In Week 3 against the Cincinnati Bengals, Wentz threw two more interceptions during the 23–23 tie game. In Week 7, against the New York Giants, he had 359 passing yards, two passing touchdowns, one rushing touchdown, and one interception in the 22–21 win. In Week 8 against the Dallas Cowboys, Wentz struggled, throwing for 123 yards and two touchdowns and two interceptions during a 23–9 win. In Week 11, Wentz went 21 for 35 throwing against the Cleveland Browns for 235 yards, two touchdowns and two interceptions, one being a pick-six in the 22–17 loss. In Week 13 against the Green Bay Packers, Wentz was benched in the third quarter for Jalen Hurts after the Eagles were trailing 20–3. Without Wentz, the Eagles went on to lose 16–30. On December 8, 2020, the Eagles named Jalen Hurts the starting quarterback for their Week 14 game against the New Orleans Saints.

At the time of his benching, Wentz scored 21 total touchdowns (16 passing, 5 rushing). However, he led the league in interceptions thrown (15), total turnovers (19), and sacks taken (50). He ended up leading the league in all of those categories at the end of the season despite only playing in 12 games.

Indianapolis Colts

Wentz was traded to the Indianapolis Colts on March 17, 2021, in exchange for a 2021 third-round pick and a 2022 first-round pick. He was reunited with former Philadelphia Eagles' coordinator Frank Reich, who had since become the head coach of the Colts. 

During training camp, Wentz suffered a foot injury that required surgery. Despite the foot surgery, Wentz was able to return in time for the September 12 season opener at home against the Seattle Seahawks, where he completed 25-of-38 passes for 251 yards and two touchdowns; however, the Colts fell short 28–16 in his Indianapolis debut. He passed for a season-high 402 yards  and two touchdowns in a 31–25 loss to the Baltimore Ravens in Week 5. 

Wentz threw for 3,563 yards, 27 touchdowns, and seven interceptions as the Colts finished the season 9–8 but failed to qualify for the playoffs after a loss in Week 18 to the Jacksonville Jaguars.

Washington Commanders

Wentz, along with the Colts' second and seventh round picks in the 2022 NFL Draft, were traded to the Washington Commanders on March 16, 2022, in exchange for 2022 second and third round picks and a conditional third-round pick in the 2023 NFL Draft. In his debut with the Commanders, Wentz threw for 313 yards with four touchdowns and two interceptions in a 28–22 victory over the Jacksonville Jaguars.

In Week 3, Wentz made his return against his former longtime team, the Philadelphia Eagles. Wentz completed 58% of his passes for 211 yards and was sacked nine times and fumbled twice in the 24–8 loss. In the 21–17 loss to the Tennessee Titans in Week 5, Wentz threw a game-sealing interception to linebacker David Long Jr. in the red zone. In the Thursday Night Football win over the Chicago Bears, Wentz fractured his ring finger on his throwing hand. He was placed on injured reserve on October 22 and re-activated on December 12, 2022, although he did not regain his starting duties due to the emergence of Taylor Heinicke as the team's starter. 

In Week 16, Wentz came in relief of Heinicke after he was benched in the fourth quarter, where he completed twelve passes for 123 yards and a touchdown in the loss to the San Francisco 49ers. With the Commanders needing to win their final two games to make the playoffs, head coach Ron Rivera reinstated Wentz as the team's starting quarterback in Week 17. Wentz had a poor performance against the Cleveland Browns completing 16 of 28 passes for 143 yards, one rushing touchdown, and three interceptions in the 24-10 loss. The loss and wins by the Green Bay Packers and Detroit Lions on the same day resulted in the Commanders being eliminated from playoff contention.

On February 27, 2023, the Commanders released Wentz after one season with the team.

NFL career statistics

Regular season

Postseason

Career awards and highlights

NFL records
 Most consecutive games with at least one touchdown pass with one interception or less (Current streak is 22 games surpassing Matt Ryan's 21 from December 2015– September 2017)
 First quarterback in NFL history to have a 4,000-yard season without having a single wide receiver with at least 500 receiving yards
 First quarterback in NFL history to throw for 20 or more touchdowns and seven or less interceptions in three consecutive seasons

Eagles franchise records
 First quarterback in team history to throw for over 4,000 yards: 4,039 (2019) 
 Most passing touchdowns in a season: 33 (2017)
 Most pass completions in a season: 388 (2019)
 Most pass attempts in a season: 607 (2016 & 2019)
 Most touchdown passes in the 1st quarter (3, 2017)
 Most touchdown passes in a calendar month (14, October 2017)
 Consecutive games with a touchdown pass (20, November 2018 – September 2020)
Season completion percentage: 69.6% (2018) (minimum 6 starts)
Lowest interception percentage: 1.2% (2019) (minimum 11 starts)

Awards
 Super Bowl champion (LII)
 Bert Bell Award (2017)
 Pro Bowl – 2017
 3× Pepsi NFL Rookie of the Week – Weeks 1, 3, and 5, 2016
 2× NFC Offensive Player of the Week – Week 3, 2016 and Week 7, 2017
 NFC Offensive Player of the Month – October 2017
 NFL Offensive Rookie of the Month – September 2016

Personal life

Wentz married Madison Oberg on July 16, 2018. The couple have two daughters, born April 2020 and November 2021.

Wentz is a Christian. He founded the AO1 Foundation in 2017. In 2018, he helped build a sports complex in Haiti. Wentz is an avid hunter and frequently returns to North Dakota for that reason.

References

External links

 
 North Dakota State Bison bio

1992 births
American football quarterbacks
American people of German descent
Living people
National Conference Pro Bowl players
North Dakota State Bison football players
Philadelphia Eagles players
Indianapolis Colts players
Washington Commanders players
Players of American football from Raleigh, North Carolina
Players of American football from North Dakota
Sportspeople from Bismarck, North Dakota
Ed Block Courage Award recipients